The Battle of Nagoszewo was a clash between Polish rebel forces and units of the Imperial Russian Army  during the January Uprising. It took place on June 2–3, 1863 near the village of Nagoszewo, which at that time belonged to Russian-controlled Congress Poland. Rebel forces, commanded by Maksymilian Broniewski fought off three columns of Russian troops. The rebels were reinforced by local peasants, who joined them. After the clash, the Russians murdered 110 residents of Nagoszew, and the village was burned. Bodies of victims were buried in a mass grave, where in 1917 a monument was unveiled.

Sources 
 Stefan Kieniewicz: Powstanie styczniowe. Warszawa: Państwowe Wydawnictwo Naukowe, 1983. .

Nagoszewo
1863 in Poland
Nagoszewo
June 1863 events